Thiladaanam (The Rite... A Passion) is a 2000 Indian Telugu-language drama film, written, and directed by film-critic K. N. T. Sastry in his debut directorial, based on the story by  Rentala Nageswara Rao. The film features H. G. Dattatreya, Brahmaji, Tanikella Bharani, and Jaya Seal in pivotal roles.

Upon release, the film received positive reviews "For its juxtaposition of two diverse ideologies existing within the same family – the father's belief in his religion and traditions and his son's revolutionary ideology. The film strikes a very fine balance in inter-generational explorations", winning the Best First Film of a Director at the 49th National Film Awards. Thiladaanam is the only Indian film to be honored with the New Currents Award at the 7th Busan International Film Festival.

It was featured in Indian Panorama section at the 33rd International Film Festival of India,
and Retrospective at the New York Indian Film Festival.

Plot
Subbaiah is an outcast Brahmin priest living out of Tiladaanam ( a Hindu ritual of giving sesame seeds as alms, which transfers the giver's sins to the receiver), the meanest form of Brahmin duty. He ekes out his living in Hyderabad, by becoming a corpse-carrier, and carrying out funeral rites. His son is a Naxalite, and his daughter-in-law, Padma, is living with him. His son Raghuram, makes a clandestine visit home during his child's birth. In search of Raghuram the anti-Naxalite team ransack Subhaiah's house. However, Raghuram escapes the police firing, killing a cop in the process. Raghuram surrenders to the cops so that his family can make a living with the government compensation. Shocked by his surrender Subbaiah dies of the trauma, while Padma awaits in vain for the compensation.

Cast
H. G. Dattatreya
Brahmaji as a naxal
Tanikella Bharani
A. V. Subramanyam
Annapoorna
Jaya Seal 
Prasad Babu
Athili Lakshmi

Awards
International Honours
New Currents Award at the 7th Busan International Film Festival
Indian Panorama section at the 33rd International Film Festival of India
Retrospective New York Indian Film Festival
One-of-a-kind Indo-German Film Festival

National Film Awards
Best Debut Film of a Director - K. N. T. Sastry

Nandi Awards
Best First Film of a Director - K. N. T. Sastry 
Best Makeup Artist - Shyam Jadcharla

References

2000s Telugu-language films
2000 films
Social realism in film
Best Debut Feature Film of a Director National Film Award winners
Films based on Indian novels
Telugu-language literature
Fictional portrayals of police departments in India
Films about Naxalism
Indian crime drama films
Films about women in India
2000 crime drama films
Films about the caste system in India
Films about social issues in India
Fictional portrayals of the Andhra Pradesh Police
Indian avant-garde and experimental films
Indian nonlinear narrative films
2000 directorial debut films
National Film Development Corporation of India films